Hokkien pronouns pose some difficulty to speakers of English due to their complexity. The Hokkien language use a variety of differing demonstrative and interrogative pronouns, and many of them are only with slightly different meanings.

Basic personal pronouns
The plural personal pronouns tend to be nasalized forms of the singular ones.

List of Hokkien personal pronouns

Archaic personal pronouns

Suffixes
Suffixes are added to pronouns to make them plural.

Demonstrative and interrogative pronouns
Usually, Hokkien pronouns are prefixed with ch- for thing or things near the speaker, and h- for one or ones distant from the speaker.

See also
Hokkien language
Hokkien grammar
Hokkien numerals

P
Pronouns by language